Svetlana Yuryevna Vysokova (born 12 May 1972) is a Russian speed skater, who won a bronze medal in the Women's Team Pursuit at the 2006 Winter Olympics.

External links
 

1972 births
Living people
People from Krasnokamsk
Speed skaters at the 1998 Winter Olympics
Speed skaters at the 2006 Winter Olympics
Speed skaters at the 2010 Winter Olympics
Olympic bronze medalists for Russia
Olympic speed skaters of Russia
Olympic medalists in speed skating
Russian female speed skaters
Medalists at the 2006 Winter Olympics
Sportspeople from Perm Krai